The term Diocese of Križevci may refer to:

 Byzantine Catholic Diocese of Križevci, an Eastern Catholic diocese (eparchy) of Byzantine rite in Croatia.
 Roman Catholic Diocese of Bjelovar and Križevci, a Roman Catholic diocese of Latin rite in Croatia.

See also 
 Catholic Church in Croatia
 Byzantine Catholic Church of Croatia and Serbia